A simple wave is a flow in a region adjacent to a region of constant state. In the language of Riemann invariant, the simple wave can also be defined as the zone where one of the Riemann invariant is constant in the region of interest, and consequently, a simple wave zone is covered by arcs of characteristics that are straight lines.

Simple waves occur quite often in nature. There is a theorem (see Courant and Friedrichs) that states that a non-constant state of flow adjacent to a constant value is always a simple wave. All expansion fans including Prandtl–Meyer expansion fan are simple waves. Compressive waves until shock wave forms are also simple waves. Weak shocks (including sound waves) are also simple waves up to second-order approximation in the shock strength.

Simple waves are also defined by the behavior that all the characteristics under hodograph transformation collapses into a single curve. This means that the Jacobian involved in the hodographic transformation is zero.

Unsteady one-dimensional simple waves
Let  be the gas density,  the velocity,  the pressure and  the speed of sound.

From the one-dimensional Euler equations, we have

which, because , can be written as

Further, since (remember that the time derivative of a function  integrated along a curve  is given by )

the two equations lead to

However, since  determines  and therefore the above derivatives must be equal so that . Thus, we obtain , whence

This equation provides the required relation  or,  or,  etc.

Thus, we obtain

,

which upon integration becomes

where  is an arbitrary function. This equation indicates that the characteristics in the - plane are just straight lines. When  and when consequently length scale and time scale associated with the initial function disappears, the problem is self-similar and the solution depends only on the ratio . This particular case is referred as the centred simple wave.

Steady two-dimensional simple waves
Similar to the unsteady one-dimensional waves, simple waves in steady two-dimensional system cab be derived. In this case, the solution is given by

The characteristics in the - plane are straight lines.

References

Flow regimes
Fluid dynamics